The Caratasca Lagoon is a large lagoon in the department of Gracias a Dios in northeastern Honduras. Puerto Lempira, the capital of the department, lies on its shores.

The largest island in the lagoon is Tansin. Its western shore is protected as part of a biological reserve.

The Caratasca Lagoon was the site of the landfall of Hurricane Mitch in 1998 which caused much ecological damage.

References

Bodies of water of Honduras
Lagoons of North America
Bodies of water of Central America